Zakrzewko  is a village in the administrative district of Gmina Łysomice, within Toruń County, Kuyavian-Pomeranian Voivodeship, in north-central Poland.

In the years 1975 – 1998, the village administratively belonged to Toruń Voivodeship.

References

Zakrzewko